Alentemol (INN) (developmental code name U-66444B), or alentamol, is a selective dopamine autoreceptor agonist described as an antipsychotic, which was never marketed.

References

Antipsychotics
Dopamine agonists
Abandoned drugs